"16 Shells From a Thirty-Ought-Six" is a song by Tom Waits appearing on his 1983 album Swordfishtrombones. In 1988, it was released as a single in support of his live performance album Big Time.

Accolades 

(*) designates unordered lists.

Formats and track listing 
All songs written by Tom Waits.
UK 7" single (IS 370)
 "16 Shells From a Thirty-Ought-Six" – 4:10
 "Big Black Mariah" – 2:41

UK 12" single (12 IS 370)
 "16 Shells From a Thirty-Ought-Six" – 4:10
 "Big Black Mariah" – 2:41
 "Ruby's Arms" – 4:44

Personnel
Adapted from the 16 Shells From a Thirty-Ought-Six liner notes.

 Tom Waits – vocals, production

Musicians
 Victor Feldman – brake drum, bell plate, snare
 Stephen Hodges – drums
 Larry Taylor – acoustic bass
 Fred Tackett – electric guitar
 Joe Romano – trombone

Production and additional personnel
 Biff Dawes – recording, mixing
 Daniel Hainey – photography

Release history

References

External links 
 

1982 songs
1988 singles
Tom Waits songs
Songs written by Tom Waits
Island Records singles